The 2021–22 Big Ten women's basketball season is expected to begin with practices in October 2021, followed by the start of the 2021–22 NCAA Division I women's basketball season in November 2021. The regular season will end in March, 2022.

Regular season
The conference schedule will be released in 8 September.

Records against other conferences
2021–22 records against non-conference foes as of (January 2, 2022):

Regular Season

Post Season

Record against ranked non-conference opponents
This is a list of games against ranked opponents only (rankings from the AP Poll):

Team rankings are reflective of AP poll when the game was played, not current or final ranking

† denotes game was played on neutral site

Head coaches

Coaching changes prior to the season

Purdue
On March 26, 2021; Purdue announced the 2021-2022 season will be the last year of the "Versyp Era" at Purdue, with Katie Gearlds joining the Lady Boilers staff and then succeeding Versyp as the head coach after the 2021-2022 season. The Journal & Courier reported on August 18, 2021 that Purdue University was investigating allegations that  Versyp created a “toxic and hostile environment,” including verbally attacking players and bullying a member of her coaching staff. It was announced on September 16, 2021 that Versyp would be retiring and replaced by Gearlds a year earlier than originally planned.

Wisconsin
On March 9, 2021, the Badgers fired Jonathan Tsipis after five years as head coach. On March 25, 2021, Marisa Moseley was named the eighth head coach in Badgers history.

Coaches

Notes: 
 All records, appearances, titles, etc. are from time with current school only. 
 Year at school includes 2021–22 season.
 Overall and Big Ten records are from time at current school and are through the beginning of the season.

Preseason national polls

Post season

Big Ten  tournament

Iowa won the conference tournament from March 2–6, 2022, at the Gainbridge Fieldhouse, Indianapolis, IN. All 14 teams from the conference play at the tournament. The top 10 teams receive a first-round bye and the top four teams receive a double bye. Teams were seeded by conference record, with ties broken by record between the tied teams followed by record of all Division I opponents, after coin toss if necessary.

Bracket
 All times are Eastern.

* denotes overtime period

NCAA tournament

Six teams from the conference were selected to participate: Iowa (as Big Ten tournament champion), and five others At-large bids: Indiana, Maryland, Michigan, Nebraska and Ohio State.

National Invitation Tournament 
Two teams from the conference were selected to participate: Minnesota & Purdue. The Big Ten conference rejected their automatic berth, the two teams qualify from at-large bids.

References